Lucas Maciel Felix (born 18 January 2000) is a Brazilian professional footballer who plays as a midfielder for Major League Soccer club New England Revolution.

Career

Youth
Maciel spent ten years with the Botafogo academy. He appeared for Botafogo's under-20 side and in the 2019 under-20 Campeonato Brasileiro.

New England Revolution II
On 16 January 2020, Maciel joined USL League One side New England Revolution II ahead of their 2020 season. He made his professional debut on 25 July 2020, starting against Union Omaha.

New England Revolution
On 22 March 2021, Maciel signed a first-team contract with New England Revolution. He made his debut on 3 May 2021, starting against Atlanta United.

Career statistics

Honours
New England Revolution
 Supporters' Shield: 2021

References

External links
 

2000 births
Living people
Brazilian footballers
Brazilian expatriate footballers
Association football midfielders
New England Revolution players
New England Revolution II players
USL League One players
Major League Soccer players
Footballers from Rio de Janeiro (city)